Lothar Jacobi (born 27 August 1939) is a German former sports shooter. He competed in the 25 metre rapid fire pistol event at the 1964 Summer Olympics.

Olympic Games
1964 Summer Olympics in Tokyo, competing for the United Team of Germany:
 Shooting – Men's 25 metre rapid fire pistol – 13th place

References

External links
 

1939 births
Living people
German male sport shooters
Olympic shooters of the United Team of Germany
Shooters at the 1964 Summer Olympics